The main religion of Puntland is Islam. All the inhabitants of the region are Sunni Muslims. Puntland's state constitution states that "Islam shall be the only religion of Puntland State of Somalia. No any other religion can be propagated in Puntland State, while the Islamic Religion and the traditions of the people of Puntland are the bases of law." Also, Muslims in Puntland are not allowed to renounce their religion. Furthermore, the constitution of Puntland restricts the formation of political parties based on a particular faith, religious beliefs, or interpretations of religious doctrine.

References

Puntland
Islam in Somalia